Hsieh Cheng-peng and Lee Hsin-han were the defending champions but decided not to participate.
Nicholas Monroe and Simon Stadler defeated Mateusz Kowalczyk and Lukáš Rosol 6–4, 6–4 in the final to win the title.

Seeds

Draw

Draw

External links
Main Draw

UniCredit Czech Open - Doubles
2013 Doubles